The Ntambanana Local Municipality was a local municipality within the uThungulu District of KwaZulu-Natal in South Africa. In 2016 the municipality was dissolved and its territory divided between Mthonjaneni Local Municipality, uMhlathuze Local Municipality and uMfolozi Local Municipality.

Results 
The following table shows the composition of the council after past elections.

December 2000 election

The following table shows the results of the 2000 election.

March 2006 election

The following table shows the results of the 2006 election.

May 2011 election

The following table shows the results of the 2011 election.

References

Ntambanana
Elections in KwaZulu-Natal